USS Winooski is a name used more than once by the United States Navy:

 , a gunboat launched on 30 July 1863 at the Boston Navy Yard.
 , an oiler laid down as Calusa on 23 April 1941 at Sparrows Point, Maryland.

United States Navy ship names